Kovach is a village in the municipality of Radnevo, in Stara Zagora Province, Bulgaria.

Villages in Stara Zagora Province